In number theory, a Liouville number is a real number  with the property that, for every positive integer , there exists a pair of integers  with  such that

Liouville numbers are "almost rational", and can thus be approximated "quite closely" by sequences of rational numbers. They are precisely those transcendental numbers that can be more closely approximated by rational numbers than any algebraic irrational number. In 1844, Joseph Liouville showed that all Liouville numbers are transcendental, thus establishing the existence of transcendental numbers for the first time.

The existence of Liouville numbers (Liouville's constant) 
Liouville numbers can be shown to exist by an explicit construction.

L = 0.11000100000000000000000100000000000000000000000000000000000000000000000000000000000000000000000000000000000000000000001...

It follows from the definition of  that its base- representation is

where the th term is in the th place.

Since this base- representation is non-repeating it follows that  is not a rational number.  Therefore, for any rational number , we have .

Then

Therefore, we conclude that any such  is a Liouville number.

Notes on the proof 

 The inequality  follows since ak ∈ {0, 1, 2, …, b−1} for all k, so at most ak = b−1. The largest possible sum would occur if the sequence of integers (a1, a2, …) were (b−1, b−1, ...), i.e. ak = b−1, for all k.  will thus be less than or equal to this largest possible sum.
 The strong inequality  follows from our motivation to eliminate the series by way of reducing it to a series for which we know a formula. We further this motivation here by selecting now from the sum  a partial sum. Therefore,  (since, even if n=1, all subsequent terms are smaller). In order to manipulate the indices so that k starts at 0, we select a partial sum from within  (also less than the total value since it's a partial sum from a series whose terms are all positive). We will choose the partial sum formed by starting at k = (n+1)! which follows from our motivation to write a new series with k=0, namely by noticing that .
For the final inequality , we have chosen this particular inequality (true because b ≥ 2, where equality follows if and only if n=1) because we wish to manipulate  into something of the form . This particular inequality allows us to eliminate (n+1)! and the numerator, using the property that (n+1)! – n! = (n!)n, thus putting the denominator in ideal form for the substitution .

Irrationality 
Since every rational number can be represented as such   we will have proven that no Liouville number can be rational.

More specifically, we show that for any positive integer  large enough that  [equivalently, for any positive integer )], no pair of integers  exists that simultaneously satisfies the pair of bracketing inequalities

If the claim is true, then the desired conclusion follows.

Let  and  be any integers with  Then we have,

If  we would then have

meaning that such pair of integers  would violate the first inequality in the definition of a Liouville number, irrespective of any choice of  .

If, on the other hand, since  then, since   is an integer, we can assert the sharper inequality   From this it follows that

Now for any integer  the last inequality above implies

Therefore, in the case  such pair of integers  would violate the second inequality in the definition of a Liouville number, for some positive integer .

Hence a Liouville number, if it exists, cannot be rational.

(The section on Liouville's constant proves that Liouville numbers exist by exhibiting the construction of one.  The proof given in this section implies that this number must be irrational.)

Uncountability
Consider, for example, the number

3.1400010000000000000000050000....
3.14(3 zeros)1(17 zeros)5(95 zeros)9(599 zeros)2(4319 zeros)6...

where the digits are zero except in positions n! where the digit equals the nth digit following the decimal point in the decimal expansion of .

As shown in the section on the existence of Liouville numbers, this number, as well as any other non-terminating decimal with its non-zero digits similarly situated, satisfies the definition of a Liouville number. Since the set of all sequences of non-null digits has the cardinality of the continuum, the same thing occurs with the set of all Liouville numbers.

Moreover, the Liouville numbers form a dense subset of the set of real numbers.

Liouville numbers and measure 
From the point of view of measure theory, the set of all Liouville numbers  is small. More precisely, its Lebesgue measure, is zero. The proof given follows some ideas by John C. Oxtoby.

For positive integers  and  set:

we have

Since

 

and  we have

 

Now

and it follows that for each positive integer ,  has Lebesgue measure zero. Consequently, so has .

In contrast, the Lebesgue measure of the set of all real transcendental numbers is infinite (since the set of algebraic numbers is a null set).

Structure of the set of Liouville numbers
For each positive integer , set

The set of all Liouville numbers can thus be written as

Since it is the intersection of countably many such open dense sets,  is comeagre, that is to say, it is a dense Gδ set.

Irrationality measure 
The Liouville–Roth irrationality measure (irrationality exponent, approximation exponent, or Liouville–Roth constant) of a real number  is a measure of how "closely" it can be approximated by rationals. In other words, given the irrationality measure  of a real number , whenever a rational approximation ,  yields  exact decimal digits, we have

for any , except for at most a finite number of "lucky"  pairs .

As a consequence of Dirichlet's approximation theorem every irrational number has irrationality measure at least 2. On the other hand, an application of Borel-Cantelli lemma shows that almost all numbers have an irrationality measure equal to 2.

Below is a table of known upper and lower bounds for the irrationality measures of certain numbers.

Irrationality base

The irrationality base is a measure of irrationality introduced by J. Sondow as an irrationality measure for Liouville numbers. It is defined as follows:

Let  be an irrational number. If there exists a real number  with the property that for any , there is a positive integer  such that

 ,

If no such  exists, then  is called a super Liouville number.

Example: The series  is a super Liouville number, while the series  is a Liouville number with irrationality base 2. ( represents tetration.)

Liouville numbers and transcendence 
Establishing that a given number is a Liouville number provides a useful tool for proving a given number is transcendental. However, not every transcendental number is a Liouville number. The terms in the continued fraction expansion of every Liouville number are unbounded; using a counting argument, one can then show that there must be uncountably many transcendental numbers which are not Liouville. Using the explicit continued fraction expansion of e, one can show that e is an example of a transcendental number that is not Liouville. Mahler proved in 1953 that  is another such example.

The proof proceeds by first establishing a property of irrational algebraic numbers. This property essentially says that irrational algebraic numbers cannot be well approximated by rational numbers, where the condition for "well approximated" becomes more stringent for larger denominators. A Liouville number is irrational but does not have this property, so it can't be algebraic and must be transcendental. The following lemma is usually known as Liouville's theorem (on diophantine approximation), there being several results known as Liouville's theorem.

Below, we will show that no Liouville number can be algebraic.

Lemma: If α is an irrational number which is the root of an irreducible polynomial f of degree n > 0 with integer coefficients, then there exists a real number A > 0 such that, for all integers p, q, with q > 0,

 

Proof of Lemma: Let M be the maximum value of |f ′(x)| (the absolute value of the derivative of f) over the interval [α − 1, α + 1]. Let α1, α2, ..., αm be the distinct roots of f which differ from α. Select some value A > 0 satisfying

 

Now assume that there exist some integers p, q contradicting the lemma. Then

 

Then p/q is in the interval [α − 1, α + 1]; and p/q is not in {α1, α2, ..., αm}, so p/q is not a root of f; and there is no root of f between α and p/q.

By the mean value theorem, there exists an x0 between p/q and α such that

 

Since α is a root of f but p/q is not, we see that |f ′(x0)| > 0 and we can rearrange:

 

Now, f is of the form  ci xi where each ci is an integer; so we can express |f(p/q)| as

 

the last inequality holding because p/q is not a root of f and the ci are integers.

Thus we have that |f(p/q)| ≥ 1/qn. Since |f ′(x0)| ≤ M by the definition of M, and 1/M > A by the definition of A, we have that

 

which is a contradiction; therefore, no such p, q exist; proving the lemma.

Proof of assertion: As a consequence of this lemma, let x be a Liouville number; as noted in the article text, x is then irrational. If x is algebraic, then by the lemma, there exists some integer n and some positive real A such that for all p, q

 

Let r be a positive integer such that 1/(2r) ≤ A. If we let m = r + n, and since x is a Liouville number, then there exist integers a, b where b > 1 such that

 

which contradicts the lemma. Hence, if a Liouville number exists, it cannot be algebraic, and therefore must be transcendental.

See also 
 Brjuno number
 Diophantine approximation

References

External links
The Beginning of Transcendental Numbers

Diophantine approximation
Mathematical constants
Articles containing proofs
Real transcendental numbers
Irrational numbers